Phlyctis psoromica is a species of lichen in the family Phlyctidaceae. Known from Australia, it was described as new to science in 2011.

References

Lichens described in 2011
Lichen species
Fungi of Australia
Gyalectales
Taxa named by Gintaras Kantvilas
Taxa named by John Alan Elix